Bahianthus is a genus of flowering plants in the family Asteraceae.

There is only one known species, Bahianthus viscosus, endemic to Brazil (States of Bahia and Espirito Santo).

References

Eupatorieae
Endemic flora of Brazil
Monotypic Asteraceae genera